Rhitymna occidentalis is a species of spider of the genus Rhitymna. It is endemic to Sri Lanka.

See also
 List of Sparassidae species

References

Sparassidae
Endemic fauna of Sri Lanka
Spiders of Asia
Spiders described in 2003